Nagykereki is a village in Hajdú-Bihar county, in the Northern Great Plain region of eastern Hungary.

Geography
It covers an area of 37.27 km² and has a population of 1384 people (2001).

References

Populated places in Hajdú-Bihar County